The Second Federal Electoral District of Chihuahua (II Distrito Electoral Federal de Chihuahua) is one of the 300 Electoral Districts into which Mexico is divided for the purpose of elections to the federal Chamber of Deputies and one of nine such districts in the state of Chihuahua.

It elects one deputy to the lower house of Congress for each three-year legislative period, by means of the first past the post system.

District territory
Under the 2005 districting scheme, Chihuahua's Second District covers the western portion of Ciudad Juárez and of the surrounding  municipality of Juárez.

The district's head town (cabecera distrital), where results from individual polling stations are gathered together and collated, is the city of  Ciudad Juárez.

Previous districting schemes

1996–2005 district
Almost exactly the same as the current configuration.

1979–1996 district
Between 1979 and 1996, the Second District was located in the south of the state, centred on the city of Hidalgo del Parral.

Deputies returned to Congress from this district

L Legislature
 1976–1979: Oswaldo Rodríguez González (PRI)
LI Legislature
 1979–1982: Jesús Chávez Baeza (PRI)
LII Legislature
 1982–1985: Alfonso Cereceros Peña (PRI)
LIII Legislature
 1985–1988: Jacinto Gómez Pasillas (PRI)
LIV Legislature
 1988–1991: Rafael Chávez Rodríguez (PRI)
LV Legislature
 1991–1994: Carlos Morales Villalobos (PRI)
LVI Legislature
 1994–1997: Alfredo Amaya (PRI)
LVII Legislature
 1997–2000: Adalberto Balderrama (PAN)
LVIII Legislature
 2000–2003: David Rodríguez Torres (PAN)
LIX Legislature
 2003–2006: Nora Yu Hernández (PRI)
LX Legislature
 2006–2009: Lilia Merodio Reza (PRI)

References

Federal electoral districts of Mexico
Chihuahua (state)